Epimedium × rubrum, known as red barrenwort, is a species of perennial flowering plant in the family Berberidaceae, cultivated in gardens. It is considered to be a hybrid between E. alpinum and E. grandiflorum (hence the symbol ×). The Royal Horticultural Society has given it the Award of Garden Merit (AGM).

Description
Epimedium × rubrum is a deciduous perennial, spreading by rhizomes. When the young leaves emerge in spring, they are tinged with red. The leaves also turn red in the autumn. The flowers appear with the young leaves in spring, and are borne on a loose raceme.

Cultivation
Epimedium × rubrum is recommended for cultivation in shade or part-shade in moist soil, although it tolerates drier conditions when well-established. Old foliage should be cut back before the new leaves and flowers appear in spring. It was given the Award of Garden Merit by the Royal Horticultural Society in 1993, with a hardiness rating of H7, meaning that it is very hardy, withstanding temperatures below .

References

rubrum
Garden plants
Hybrid plants